Roberto Valenzuela Elphick was a British-Chilean bishop of the Methodist Episcopal Church, elected in 1936.  He was born 29 August 1873 in Antofagasta, Chile.  He was the son of a British nitrate producer, Donald E. Elphick, and Tomasa Valenzuela, a Chilean Roman Catholic.  Roberto was converted to the Evangelical Church by reading a New Testament given him by a Methodist Sunday School teacher, Mina Fawcett.  Later his father, mother, and most of his brothers were also converted.

Roberto joined the Presbyterian Church, and was ordained a minister in 1897.  He transferred to the Chile Annual Conference of the M.E. Church in 1906.  Prior to his election to the episcopacy, Roberto served as a pastor, educator, and evangelist.  He was a delegate to the International Missionary Conference in Jerusalem, 1928.  He was elected bishop in Buenos Aires, and was consecrated to that office in Columbus, Ohio.

Selected writings 
 Autobiography, in Spanish, a copy of which resides in the Methodist Bishops' Collection.
 The Teachings of Christ.

See also 
 List of bishops of the United Methodist Church

References 
 Leete, Frederick DeLand, Methodist Bishops.  Nashville, The Parthenon Press, 1948.

1873 births
Year of death missing
Bishops of the Methodist Episcopal Church
Methodist evangelists
Valenzuela Elphick
Valenzuela Elphick
Valenzuela Elphick
Valenzuela Elphick
Autobiographers
Chilean United Methodist bishops
Chilean Christian religious leaders
Converts to Methodism from Roman Catholicism
People from Antofagasta
20th-century Methodist bishops
20th-century Presbyterian ministers
19th-century Presbyterian ministers